Robert John Sedlock (born February 7, 1937) is a former American football player who played with the Buffalo Bills. He played college football at the University of Georgia.

References

1937 births
Living people
American football tackles
Georgia Bulldogs football players
Buffalo Bills players
Players of American football from Canton, Ohio
American Football League players